Scandia mutabilis is a species of hydroids of the family Hebellidae. It was first described in 1907 by James Ritchie from specimens obtained from Cape Verde. It also occurs in the Gulf of Mexico.

References

Hebellidae
Animals described in 1907